Khyzyr Khakimovich Appayev (born 27 January 1990) is a Russian football forward. He plays for FC Fakel Voronezh.

Career
Appayev made his debut in the Russian Second Division for FC Druzhba Maykop on 17 April 2011 in a game against FC Taganrog, with his Russian Premier League debut for FC Krylia Sovetov Samara coming on 6 March 2012 against FC Amkar Perm.

On 11 June 2014, Appayev had his contract with FC Krasnodar terminated by mutual consent.

He was released from his contract by FC Tambov on 1 January 2020.

Career statistics

References

1990 births
Sportspeople from Nalchik
Living people
Russian footballers
Association football forwards
PFC Krylia Sovetov Samara players
FC Krasnodar players
FC Rotor Volgograd players
FC Orenburg players
FC Arsenal Tula players
Riga FC players
FC Avangard Kursk players
FC Tambov players
FC Tekstilshchik Ivanovo players
FC Fakel Voronezh players
Russian Premier League players
Russian First League players
Russian Second League players
Latvian Higher League players
Russian expatriate footballers
Expatriate footballers in Latvia
Russian expatriate sportspeople in Latvia